The Widow of Bath is a British thriller television series which first aired on the BBC in six episodes between 1 June and 6 July 1959. Margot Bennett adapted her own 1952 novel of the same title. The show starred Guy Rolfe, Barbara Murray and John Justin. Art director Roy Oxley designed the sets.  It is now considered lost.

Cast
 Guy Rolfe as Charles Atkinson (6 episodes)
 Barbara Murray as Lucy Bath (6 episodes)
 John Justin as Hugh Everton (6 episodes)
 Peter Sallis as Cady (6 episodes)
 Walter Horsbrugh as Simmons (6 episodes)
 Jennifer Wright as Jan Deverill (6 episodes) 
 Arthur Shepherd as Myopic waiter (6 episodes)
 Fay Compton as Mrs. Leonard (5 episodes)
 Andrew Cruickshank as Det. Insp. Leigh (5 episodes)
 William Sherwood as Hotel manager (5 episodes) 
 George Roderick as Guido (4 episodes) 
 John Forbes-Robertson as  Police Constable (3 episodes) 
 John Ebdon as  Det. Sgt. Harkness (3 episodes)
 Lesley Nunnerley as Zoe (3 episodes)
 Fred Ferris as Bathing-hut attendant (2 episodes)
 David Davenport as English waiter (2 episodes)
 Malcolm Keen as Gregory Bath (1 episode)
 Robert Vahey as Photographer (1 episode)
 Freda Bamford as  Customer (1 episode)
 Harry Littlewood as Peters (1 episode) 
 Van Boolen as Castros (1 episode)  
 John Kidd as Stokes (1 episode)

References

Bibliography
 Reilly, John M. Twentieth Century Crime & Mystery Writers. Springer, 2015.

External links
 

BBC television dramas
1959 British television series debuts
1959 British television series endings
English-language television shows
Television shows based on British novels